The 1973 New Orleans Saints season was the team's seventh as a member of the National Football League (NFL). They improved on their previous season's output of 2–11–1, winning five games. The team failed to qualify for the playoffs for the seventh consecutive season.

New Orleans made a disastrous trade in January, dealing the No. 2 overall selection in the 1973 NFL Draft to the Baltimore Colts for defensive end Billy Newsome. The Colts used the traded pick to select LSU quarterback Bert Jones, who guided the team to three consecutive AFC East division championships from 1975 to 1977.

J.D. Roberts, who became the Saints' second head coach midway through the 1970 season, was fired August 27, two days after a 31–6 loss to the New England Patriots in the fourth exhibition game. Roberts was replaced by offensive backfield coach John North. Roberts ended his Saints tenure with a 7–25–3 mark.

The Saints opened the year with a 62–7 debacle in the loss to the Atlanta Falcons at home. The first quarter of that game was scoreless. Eight days later, they were drubbed on Monday Night Football by the Dallas Cowboys, 40–3.

They did however hold O. J. Simpson to 74 yard on 20 carries in the team's first ever shutout, with a 13–0 win over the Buffalo Bills. Simpson went on to break the single season rushing record in yardage that year with 2,003.

Offseason

NFL draft

Personnel

Staff

Roster

Schedule

Standings

References

New Orleans Saints seasons
New Orleans Saints
New Orl